Wogan Philipps, 2nd Baron Milford (25 February 1902 – 30 November 1993) was the only member of the Communist Party of Great Britain (CPGB) ever to sit in the House of Lords.

Early life
Philipps was the eldest son of Laurence Philipps, 1st Baron Milford. Philipps aimed to become an artist and set up a studio in Paris, but found little success.  He abandoned this to join Medical Aid to Spain, acting as an ambulance driver for the Republicans in the Spanish Civil War. During the conflict, he was wounded and had to return to Britain. On his return, he encouraged Nan Green to take his place and, in her absence, paid for the education of her children.

At the end of the Spanish Civil War, Phillips chartered a ship, paid for by donations, to transport 5000 Spanish Republicans from France to Mexico. 

Following his experiences, he joined the Communist Party of Great Britain (CPGB), which led his father to disinherit him.

Post-war life and career
In 1946, Philipps was elected as a Communist councillor on Cirencester Urban District Council, but soon lost the seat.  In the 1950 general election, he stood for the House of Commons in the Cirencester and Tewkesbury constituency, but took only 432 votes. During the campaign, opponents described by Hymie Fagan as "fascists" threw rotten food, and an attempt was made to force his car off the road. In 1959, he narrowly lost a rural council by-election.  Following this, he and his third wife went to study in the Soviet Union.

In 1962, Philipps inherited his father's title and agreed to sit in the House of Lords as the second Baron Milford. Ironically, this meant that the CPGB's last Parliamentary representative was in the House of Lords. He intended to disclaim the peerage but the CPGB leader Harry Pollitt persuaded him to stay on; in his maiden speech he called for the abolition of the institution.

Personal life and death 
In 1928, he married the novelist Rosamond Lehmann. The couple had two children: Hugo, who became 3rd Baron Milford on his father's death, and Sarah. By the end of the 1930s, Lehmann had left Philipps for poet Cecil Day-Lewis, but she and Philipps did not divorce until 1944.

Philipps' second marriage was to Cristina Casati, Viscountess Hastings, in 1944. She was previously married to Francis Hastings, 16th Earl of Huntingdon and was the only child of the eccentric Italian arts patron Luisa Casati. The couple ran a progressive farm in Gloucestershire.

His wife Christina died in 1953. A year later, Philipps married Tamara Kravetz, the widow of William Rust, editor of the Daily Worker. The couple moved to Hampstead, where they lived until Philipps' death.

Philipps died in London on 30 November 1993, aged 91.

Arms

References

External links
Wogan Philipps profile. Retrieved 21 September 2007.

Communist Party of Great Britain members
Communist Party of Great Britain councillors
Councillors in Gloucestershire
Milford
Phillips, Wogan
Phillips, Wogan
International Brigades personnel